Lhong Klin Chan (literally: "enchanted by the scent of sandalwood") is a Thai TV series aired on Channel 7 from May 26 to July 22, 2021 on Wednesdays and Thursdays from 08:30 pm to 10:30 pm for 18 episodes.

Storyline 
Warnrak, a female investigator, gets transferred to Don Hinkab, her small hometown in order to investigate the homicide of Chankrapor, a local beautiful young woman who was murdered by mysterious serial killer named "Kattakorn Dokmai Chan" (ฆาตกรดอกไม้จันทน์, "sandalwood flower killer").

Warnrak meets Din, a local forensic pathologist and medical physician, who used to be her friend in childhood and often annoyed her, also teams up with her in order to find the murderer. Together with them is Trichai, a young and handsome police lieutenant, who is always ready to help.

The more they investigate, the riskier the mission when the murderer tries to get rid of all the witnesses and to reach her.

Cast 
Main
Anyarin Terathananpat as Warnrak Satta (Warn)
Thanwa Suriyajak as Pathapee (Din)
Rinyarat Watchararojsiri as Sirinya (Chankrapor or Chan)
Chakkraphat Angsutanamalee as Tangtai, troubled boy who try to investigate the death of Chan
Chanakan Poonsiriwong as Trichai (Tee)

Supporting
Jaturong  Kolimart as Phana, police commander of Don Hinkab and Tangtai's uncle
Sirilapas Kongtrakarn as Weluree (We), Phana's lover
Pasathorn Songthawornthawee as Lau, male nurse, Warn and Din's friend
Kittiya Jitpakdee as Jang, beauty salon owner, Warn and Din's friend
Apisara Wongtassaneey as Namwhan, celebrity young woman who courts Din
Kanin Puttamanunt as Tossaphum, young police, Warnrak's lover
Chanapat Runghiranpraphakorn as Torsak (Kom), pub owner
Phiphatphol Komaratat as Tawee, Don Hinkab headman, Weluree's father
Chomwichai Meksuwan as Olarn, lawyer and Kom's friend
Athiwat Sanitwong na Ayutthaya as Khomkrit, superior police, Warnrak's father
Kanta Danao as Rattana, Warnrak's mother
Surangkhana Sunthornphanawet as Pranee, Din's mother and Rattana's friend
Thitinan Suwannasak as Suchart, Din's senior medical physician friend
Weerachai Hattagowit as Kajorn, local politician
Pongsanart Vinsiri as Jew, local trader
Wittaya Jetaphai as Suphat, non-commissioned police of Don Hinkab, Warnrak's assistant
Wassana Jeamchawee as Phen, Suphat's wife
Narongsak Angkab as Yaem, non-commissioned police of Don Hinkab, Warnrak's assistant

Guest appearances
Phenphet Phenkul as Phiphat, wealthy businessman, Chan's stepfather
Kevlin Kortland as Patra, Phiphat's mistress, Chan's mother
Trakarn Punthumlerdrujee as Pasin, former Don Hinkab mayor, Din's father
Watsaporn Wattanakoon as Patcharee, TV host, Warn's friend
Wayne Falconer as Somyos, influential politician, Namwhan's father
Sawanee Utoomma as Maeying, medium
Sasisawat Sutthikasem as Niti, late police who investigates the death of Chan
Thanakorn Kittisap as Phat, local bus driver, one of Kattakorn Dokmai Chan's victims

Production 
Lhong Klin Chan is a TV series adaptation of the novel in the same title by Nichnita. It is the second series after Lilawadee Plerng in early 2015 that the two lead performers (Anyarin Terathananpat and Thanwa Suriyajak) joined together.

In addition, the series is also similar to Lilawadee Plerng, because they are in the same investigation genre, as well as produced by the same production crew. Although the two are not related at all.

References

External links 

2020s Thai television series
2021 Thai television series debuts
2021 Thai television series endings
Channel 7 (Thailand) original programming
Thai drama television series
Thai mystery television series
Thai television soap operas